Henry James Greenslade (28 August 1866 – 18 April 1945) was a Liberal Party Member of Parliament in New Zealand.

Biography

Greenslade was born in Auckland, but came to Thames, where he grew up, with his parents when he was less than two years old.  He was Mayor of Thames in 1898–1900. He resigned from the mayoralty in March 1900, as he had bought a farm in Ōhaupō in the Waipa District.

He won the Waikato electorate in the 1905 general election, and held it to 1911, when he was defeated by the Reform candidate Alexander Young.

In 1935, Greenslade was awarded the King George V Silver Jubilee Medal. He died in Hamilton on 18 April 1945.

Notes

References

1866 births
1945 deaths
New Zealand Liberal Party MPs
Mayors of Thames
Unsuccessful candidates in the 1899 New Zealand general election
Unsuccessful candidates in the 1911 New Zealand general election
Unsuccessful candidates in the 1902 New Zealand general election
Members of the New Zealand House of Representatives
New Zealand MPs for North Island electorates
19th-century New Zealand politicians